The 1902 Illinois Fighting Illini football team was an American football team that represented the University of Illinois during the 1902 Western Conference football season.  In their second season under head coach Edgar Holt, the Illini compiled a 10 wins, 2 losses and  1 draws  record and finished in 4th place in the Western Conference. Tackle Jake Stahl was the team captain.

Schedule

References

Illinois
Illinois Fighting Illini football seasons
Illinois Fighting Illini football